Waaia is a town in northern Victoria, Australia in the Shire of Moira local government area,  north of the state capital, Melbourne. The area is home to mainly irrigated dairy farms.

Waaia was established in the late 1880s to cater for the increasing rural population of the surrounding area following the opening of the railway line in October 1888, and a Post Office opened on 17 December that year. The rail line closed in 1986.
   
The town consists of a school (established 1890), a hotel and an Australian rules football ground (the town has a team in the Picola & District Football League), along with around 10 houses.

Waaia is home to an annual tractor pull, organised by the local community action group.

References

Towns in Victoria (Australia)
Shire of Moira